The Reluctant Sadist (AKA I, a Nobleman;) is a 1967 Danish/Swedish comedy film directed by Mac Ahlberg and Peer Guldbrandsen, and starring Gabriel Axel in the role of Marcel de Sade.

Cast
 Gabriel Axel - Marcel de Sade
 Buster Larsen - Lawyer
 Karl Stegger - Mikkelsen
 Elsa Prawitz - Mrs. Mikkelsen
 Carl Ottosen - Flyttemand
 Preben Nikolajsen - Flyttemand
  - Mikkelsen's office lady
 Bjørn Puggaard-Müller - Mikkelsen's procurator
 Carl-Axel Elfving - Music professor
 Hans Brenå - Balletmester
 John Price - Auditor
 Tove Maës - Mrs Vibeke Poulsen
 Lise Thomsen - Office lady
 Børge Møller Grimstrup - Police officer
 Klaus Pagh - Bank clerk
 Poul Bundgaard - Bank direktor
 Preben Kaas - Publisher
 Lisbeth Lindeborg - Olga
 Hans Lindgren - Count
 Ove Sprogøe - Baron Neully du Prat
 Paul Hagen - James
 Lotte Horne - Else, manicure lady
 Joakim Rasmussen - Auktionarius
  - Lady in bar
 Lotte Tarp - Baronesse
 Jeanne Darville - Countess
 Bente Juhl - En sagførerkone
 Simon Rosenbaum - En herre
 Ulla Johansson - Bogforlæggerens kone

References

External links

I, a Nobleman at the Danish National Filmography

1967 films
Danish comedy films
1960s Danish-language films
Swedish comedy films
Films directed by Mac Ahlberg
Films directed by Peer Guldbrandsen
Films scored by Sven Gyldmark
1960s Swedish films